Tribe of Hip Hop is a 2016 South Korean music show presented by Shin Dong-yup and San E. It airs on JTBC on Fridays at 21:40 (KST).

Format 
It is a show where all 50 contestants must not be professional or underground rappers, or act as a main rapper (but can be lead rapper) of a group, but can be well-known singers, actors, models and TV personalities.

In the recruitment challenge, contestant can choose to write part of their lyrics based on a popular rap track, and unlike The Voice, the contestants' identity will be revealed after the first part of the performance. If more than one 'house' want accepted the contestants, each house will use diamonds (as in the idiom 'diamond in the rough' ) to bid on the contestants, but if the house run out of diamonds each episode, they can only pick members that were unopposed. In the 1-on-1 challenge, two rappers go head-to-head to a track with adjusted lyrics by their mentor, but contestants can perform with their own lyrics. While contestants can intimidate each other, it is not a diss battle.

The winner to win a ring with a full1-carat diamond .

Cast

Presenter
 Shin Dong-yup
 San E

Season 1

Producer

 MC Sniper
 P-Type
 Cheetah
 KittiB
 Lil Boi
 DinDin
 Hanhae
 Jooheon

Hidden Card

 Sleepy
 Basick
 Mino

Participants
 Kim Young-ok
 Yeom Jung-in
 Yang Hee-kyung
 Choi Byung-joo
 Lee Yong-nyeo
 Lee Gyung-jin
 Kim Young-im
 Moon Hee-kyung

Season 2. Hip Hop Tribe 2: Game of Thrones

Producer

Participants 

 ELIM  The contestant was eliminated.

Special Guests 
 Kev Nish&Prohgress

Mission 

 ELIM  The contestant was eliminated.   
 Win     The contestant won.

Semi-Finale 

*Moon Hee-kyung & Michelle Lee changed to the House of Hi-Lite.

Finale

References

External links
 

2016 South Korean television series debuts
Korean-language television shows
JTBC original programming
South Korean music television shows
South Korean hip hop
Music competitions in South Korea
Hip hop television